The women's 3x3 basketball tournament at the 2018 Asian Games was held at the Gelora Bung Karno Tennis Center Court, Jakarta, Indonesia from 21 to 26 August 2018. Teams were restricted to under-23 players.

Squads

Results
All times are Western Indonesia Time (UTC+07:00)

Preliminary

Pool A

Pool B

Pool C

Pool D

Knockout round

Quarterfinals

Semifinals

Bronze medal game

Gold medal game

Final standing

References

External links
3-on-3 Basketball at the 2018 Asian Games

Women